Salzburg Airport , branded as Salzburg Airport W. A. Mozart, is Austria's second largest airport. It serves Salzburg, the fourth-largest Austrian city, and is a gateway to Austria's numerous ski areas. It is jointly owned by Salzburg municipality (25%) and Salzburg state (75%). The airport is named after the Austrian composer Wolfgang Amadeus Mozart.

History

Pre-World War II
In 1910, the first powered aircraft taxied on to the new race track in Salzburg-Aigen. In 1926, Deutsche Luft Hansa inaugurated the Munich-Salzburg-Bad Reichenhall route. In 1927, the Vienna-Salzburg-Innsbruck route was started by ÖLAG (Austrian Aviation AG). In one of the earlier incidents Luft Hansa, which flew the London-Brussels-Frankfurt-Munich-Vienna route with Sabena, made a forced landing in Salzburg. 1939 saw the introduction of the Berlin-Prague-Salzburg-Venice and Munich-Salzburg-Klagenfurt-Ljubljana-Rijeka routes, which were planned for the summer schedule.

The war years
At the start of World War II, on 1 September 1939, Salzburg Airport was seized and in 1943 the "Luftgaukommando VII" in Munich was put in charge of it. In the autumn of 1944 the newly developed fighter jet Messerschmitt Me 262 appeared. When the United States Air Force first bombed the city of Salzburg on 16 October 1944, with a subsequent 15 air attacks on the city, the airport remained undamaged. Salzburg Airport was the first Austrian airport to become a part of European scheduled traffic again.

Post war
On 1 August 1958, a control tower was put into operation after a 15-month construction period and a new terminal was opened in 1966.

The airport reached the target of 1,265,000 passengers in 2000, and British Airways announced flights to Salzburg from London. These flights were cancelled a year later. Also in 2001, low-cost carrier Ryanair landed at Salzburg, its first Austrian destination. This was also the first time an Austrian airport hosted a low-cost carrier. Aer Lingus commenced flights to Salzburg from Dublin for their winter schedule in 2005. In 2006, Ryanair started services to Charleroi, which ended in 2007, and Dublin.

In spring 2014 the airport's home carrier Austrian Airlines announced the closure of their ticketing and service counters at Salzburg Airport due to decreasing demand. Additional services are instead provided directly at the check-in counters.

In August 2016, German low-cost airline Eurowings announced it would open its second Austrian base in Salzburg, with flights to six European metropolitan destinations from January 2017.

In May 2020, amidst the COVID-19 pandemic, Wizz Air announced six new routesbeginning in July 2020creating new connections to the region. In the same time, Austrian Airlines announced the termination of their route from Salzburg to their hub at Vienna International Airport after 60 years, partially due to the heavily expanded Railjet high-speed train connections between the cities.

Terminals
Salzburg Airport consists of two passenger terminals:

Terminal 1 is the main building, featuring 26 check-in desks, several service counters, some shops and restaurants and a visitors terrace. The airside area consists of 10 boarding gates that can be used for Schengen and non-Schengen destinations. As there are no jet bridges, walk- and bus-boarding is used. There is a business lounge operated by Salzburg Airport

Terminal 2 is the much smaller one and features nine additional check-in counters and four boarding gates, as well as a designated area to check in skiing equipment. It has limited passenger facilities due to its use for seasonal peak-time traffic.

Airlines and destinations
The following airlines offer regular scheduled and charter flights at Salzburg Airport:

Statistics

Ground transport
The airport is located 3 km from the city centre. Salzburg trolleybus lines 2 and 10, each with service every 10 minutes, connect the airport to the rest of Salzburg's public transport system. The main station is reachable in about 25 minutes and the inner city in about 30 minutes.

See also
 Transport in Austria
 List of airports in Austria

References

External links

 Official website
 
 

Airports in Austria
Airports established in 1926
Airport
Buildings and structures in Salzburg
International airports in Austria